This is a list of heads of state and government who have Jewish heritage.

Heads of state and government

See also
 Lists of Jews in politics
List of Jewish states and dynasties

References

 
 
Lists of heads of government

Heads of state and government